This is a list of airports in the Comoros, sorted by location.



List

See also 
 Transport in Comoros
 List of airports by ICAO code: F#Comoros
 Wikipedia: WikiProject Aviation/Airline destination lists: Africa#Comoros

References

External links 
 Lists of airports in Comoros:
 Great Circle Mapper
 World Aero Data

 
Comoros
Airports
Airports
Comoros